"Vault of Death" is an episode of Thunderbirds, a British Supermarionation television series created by Gerry and Sylvia Anderson and filmed by their production company AP Films (APF; later Century 21 Productions) for ITC Entertainment. Written by Dennis Spooner and directed by David Elliott, it was first broadcast on 23 December 1965 on ATV Midlands as the 13th episode of Series One. It is the seventh episode in the official running order.

Set in the 2060s, Thunderbirds follows the missions of International Rescue, a secret organisation which uses technologicallyadvanced rescue vehicles to save human life. The lead characters are exastronaut Jeff Tracy, founder of International Rescue, and his five adult sons, who pilot the organisation's primary vehicles: the Thunderbird machines. In "Vault of Death", International Rescue are called upon to save a Bank of England employee who is trapped inside a maximum-security vault which is slowly being drained of air. As the Tracy brothers, supported by field agent Lady Penelope, struggle to open the vault, the outcome of the mission is threatened by some uncharacteristically obstructive behaviour from Penelope's chauffeur, Parker.

In 1967, Century 21 released an audio adaptation on vinyl EP record (Lady Penelope and Parker, catalogue number MA 118), narrated by Penelope's voice actor, Sylvia Anderson. "Vault of Death" had its first UKwide network transmission on 1 November 1991 on BBC2.

Plot
To test the Bank of England's vault, Lady Penelope and Parker (voiced by Sylvia Anderson and David Graham) are challenged to break into it. Using only a stethoscope, Parker, an expert safe-cracker, unlocks the door in less than three hours. Bank president Lord Silton's case for a new strongroom is proven and the bank installs a modern vault with an electronic door, to which Silton has the only key. When the door is closed, the air inside the vault is pumped out to vacuum-preserve the contents.

The vault is sealed and Silton leaves to dine with Penelope at Creighton-Ward Mansion. It soon becomes clear that an absent-minded employee called Lambert is still at his desk inside the vault, unaware that he is trapped and running out of air. Knowing that only Silton can unlock the door, his aide Lovegrove transmits an emergency signal to his briefcase.

At the mansion, Parker is disturbed to come across a newspaper article about a prison escape by a professional thief nicknamed "LightFingered Fred". When Silton receives Lovegrove's signal, Penelope asks if the bank is being robbed, startling Parker and causing him to spill drinks all over Silton. Parker quietly sabotages Penelope's videophone to stop Silton calling Lovegrove and finding out what the problem is. At Penelope's suggestion, they set off for London in FAB 1, but Parker deliberately prolongs the journey – driving slowly, taking wrong turns, and then stopping and pretending to be lost. When Penelope demands an explanation for his behaviour, Parker tells her that when he was in prison he shared a cell with Fred, who said his life's ambition was to rob the Bank of England. Now Fred has escaped, Parker is reluctant to go to London in case he ends up foiling his friend's plan. Penelope takes the wheel but proves to be a terrible driver, narrowly avoiding an accident before leaving the road and cutting across country.

With no sign of Silton, Lovegrove radios International Rescue. John Tracy (voiced by Ray Barrett) relays the details from the Thunderbird 5 space station to Tracy Island, and Jeff (Peter Dyneley) dispatches Scott (Shane Rimmer) in Thunderbird 1 followed by Virgil and Alan (David Holliday and Matt Zimmerman) in Thunderbird 2. However, on arriving in London, the brothers establish that the city's underground power cables prevent them from using Thunderbird 2s Mole pod vehicle to tunnel into the vault. Their cutting equipment fails to penetrate the door, so Scott calls base for ideas on how to reach Lambert. Grandma (voiced by Christine Finn) suggests there could be a way into the vault from the disused London Underground.

As Lambert, gasping for air, finally discovers he is locked in, Virgil and Alan access Bank Station and plant explosives on a wall backing directly onto the vault. Penelope, Parker and Silton reach the bank, but Silton realises that he left his key at Penelope's. Parker asks Penelope for one of her hairpins. As Virgil and Alan detonate the explosives, blowing a hole in the wall, Parker uses the hairpin to pick the lock and open the door. Virgil and Alan lead the breathless Lambert away. Appalled that the vault has been defeated with such ease, Silton and Lovegrove agree to reinstate the old vault.

In the closing scene, Fred breaks into the now-deserted vault on his own, amused to find that Parker and the Tracys have beaten him to it.

Production
The seventh episode to be produced, "Vault of Death" sees the reintroduction of Lady Penelope and Parker following their brief appearance in the first episode, "Trapped in the Sky", and is the characters' first centric episode. According to Chris Bentley, the episode presents the duo more as comic relief than competent undercover agents.

"Vault of Death" is one of several early Thunderbirds episodes that were extended from 25 to 50 minutes after Lew Grade – APF's owner, who had been highly impressed by the 25minute version of "Trapped in the Sky" – ordered the runtime doubled so the series would fill an hour-long TV timeslot. Material not present in the original version includes the staged bank robbery at the start of the episode; some of the scenes set at Creighton-Ward Mansion; shots of the two Thunderbirds parked at a heliport in the City of London; Parker telling Penelope about him and Fred, including a flashback to their time in prison; and Grandma describing the London Underground.

Penelope and Parker's night-time raid on the old vault – which sees the characters chloroforming a policeman guarding the bank, then using plastic explosive to blow open the front door before making their way to the vault anteroom – combined puppet footage with close-ups of live actors. Judith Shutt, one of the series' puppet operators, served as Penelope's arm and eye double for shots of the character peering through a keyhole and later snapping her fingers.

The scale model representing the London heliport tower was partly adapted from a model that had appeared as Marineville Tower in the previous APF series, Stingray. In one of the bank scenes, an employee is first heard speaking with a voice provided by Shane Rimmer, only for this to change to David Graham in a later shot. The voice of Lovegrove, supplied by Ray Barrett, was an impression of John Gielgud. The episode's incidental music was performed by a group of 24 musicians and recorded on 8 October 1965.

Reception
Tom Fox of Starburst magazine rates the episode three out of five, calling it a bizarre and humorous instalment.

According to Marcus Hearn, the episode's comedy peaks with the scene of Penelope's dangerous driving. Hearn believes that "Vault of Death" playfully highlights American misconceptions about the British while making a serious statement about the pitfalls of technological progress: the penetration of a hi-tech vault with conventional explosive and improvised lock-pick symbolises "experience and ingenuity [triumphing] over supposedly state-of-the-art equipment." He considers this an example of Thunderbirds "underlying pessimism" about advancements in technology.

References

Works cited

External links

1965 British television episodes
London Underground in popular culture
Television episodes about bank robbery
Television episodes set in London
Television episodes set in prisons
Thunderbirds (TV series) episodes